The 20th Panzer Division was an armoured division in the German Army during World War II. It was created from parts of the 19th Infantry Division.

The division fought exclusively on the Eastern Front, taking part in the battles of Moscow and Kursk. It eventually surrendered to US and Soviet forces in Czechoslovakia in May 1945.

History
The 20th Panzer Division was formed on 15 October 1940 after the decision had been made to weaken the existing German tank divisions to create new ones. The new division drew units from various active and reserve units, among them the 19th Infantry Division which had been converted to a tank division itself, having become the 19th Panzer Division.

Attached to Army Group Center, the division participated in the opening stages of Operation Barbarossa and remained in the front echelon of attack during the series of advances on Minsk, Smolensk and took part in Operation Typhoon, the failed attack on Moscow. It remained on the central front during the winter of 1941–42, engaged in defensive operations and retreat. In March 1942 it was withdrawn to Bryansk for refitting and a rest after heavy casualties during the winter that lead to disbanding of a number of its units.

The 20th Panzer Division, consisting of just one of the nominal three tank battalions, remained in the central sector of the Eastern Front, taking part in the capture of Voronezh in mid-1942 but otherwise engaged in defensive operations. It took part in the defence of Orel in the winter of 1942–43 and, in July 1943, was part of the northern spearhead during the battle of Kursk. The rest of 1943 was spent in a long retreat between Orel, Gomel, Orsha, and Vitebsk.

The 20th Panzer Division spent the winter of 1944 fighting in the Polotsk, Vitebsk, Bobruisk and Cholm areas. Having suffered heavy losses during the Red Army's Operation Bagration, the division was sent to Romania for refitting in August 1944. In October, the division was sent to East Prussia, and then sent to Hungary on 6 January, 1945, to partake in the Garam (S:Hron) battles raging in northern Hungary. It then retreated through Breslau, Schweinitz and Neisse in Silesia (now part of Poland). The division was transferred to Görlitz (east of Dresden on the post-1945 German frontier with Poland). On 19 April 1945, the division was involved in a counteroffensive west of Görlitz in the direction of Niesky, but disengaged three days later and retreated west. It counterattacked again in the Bautzen area, succeeding in relieving the local garrison at heavy cost to Soviet forces. By 26 April 1945, the division was situated northwest of Dresden; by 6 May it retreated south across the Czechoslovakian border. Some divisional elements surrendered to the Red Army near Teplice-Sanov (northwest of Prague), whilst the rest, including elements of Panzer-Aufklärungs-Abteilung 20. surrendered to the U.S. Army at Rokycany, (between Prague and Plzeň); they were handed over to the Soviet forces.

Organization
The organisation of the division:

1941 
 Schützen-Brigade 20
 Schützen-Regiment 59
 Schützen-Battalion I
 Schützen-Battalion II
 Schützen-Regiment 112
 Schützen-Battalion I
 Schützen-Battalion II
 Kradschützen-Battalion 20
 Panzer-Regiment 21
 Panzer-Abteilung I
 Panzer-Abteilung II
 Panzer-Abteilung III
 Artillerie-Regiment 92
 Artillerie-Abteilung I
 Artillerie-Abteilung II
 Artillerie-Abteilung III
 Aufklärungs-Abteilung 20
 Panzerjäger-Abteilung 92
 Pionier-Battalion 92
 Nachrichten-Abteilung 92

1942 
 Panzergrenadier-Regiment 59
 Panzergrenadier-Battalion I
 Panzergrenadier-Battalion II
 Panzergrenadier-Regiment 112
 Panzergrenadier-Battalion I
 Panzergrenadier-Battalion II
 Panzer-Regiment 21
 Panzer-Abteilung I
 Panzer-Abteilung II
 Panzer-Artillerie-Regiment 92
 Panzer-Artillerie-Abteilung I
 Panzer-Artillerie-Abteilung II
 Panzer-Artillerie-Abteilung III
 Panzer-Aufklärungs-Abteilung 20
 Heeres-Flak-Artillerie-Abteilung 295
 Panzerjäger-Abteilung 92
 Panzer-Pionier-Battalion 92
 Panzer-Nachrichten-Abteilung 92

Commanding officers
The commanders of the division:
Generalleutnant Horst Stumpff, 13 November 1940 – 10 September 1941
Oberst Georg von Bismarck, 10 September 1941 – 13 October 1941 (acting)
Generalmajor Wilhelm Ritter von Thoma, 14 October 1941 – 30 June 1942
Generalmajor Walter Düvert, 1 July 1942 – 10 October 1942
Oberst Heinrich Freiherr von Lüttwitz, 10 October 1942 – 30 November 1942 (acting)
Generalmajor Heinrich Freiherr von Lüttwitz, 1 December 1942 – 11 May 1943
Generalleutnant Mortimer von Kessel, 12 May 1943 – 1 January 1944
Oberst Werner Marcks, 1 January 1944 – 1 February 1944 (acting)
Generalleutnant Mortimer von Kessel, 2 February 1944 – 5 November 1944
Oberst Hermann von Oppeln-Bronikowski, 6 November 1944 – 31 December 1944 (acting)
Generalmajor Hermann von Oppeln-Bronikowski, 1 January 1945 – 8 May 1945

References

Bibliography
 
 

Windrow, Martin. "The Panzer Divisions", Osprey Publishing Ltd., 1982, 
Cornish, Nik. "Images of Kursk", Brassey's, 2002,

External links
 

2*20
Military units and formations established in 1940
Military units and formations disestablished in 1945